Khalouat alt. Khalwat is a local authority the Hasbaya District in Lebanon.

History 
In 1838, during the Ottoman era, Eli Smith noted the population of el-Khulwat as being Druze.

References

Bibliography

External links 
 Khalouat, Localiban

Populated places in Hasbaya District
Druze communities in Lebanon